is a train station on the Hankyu Railway Kyoto Line located in Nagaokakyō, Kyoto Prefecture, Japan.

Layout
This station has 2 island platforms serving 4 tracks on the ground. Ticket gates are located in the building above the tracks.

Usage
In fiscal 2007, about 6,769,000 passengers started travel from this station annually.

History 
Nagaoka-tenjin Station opened on 1 November 1928.

Station numbering was introduced to all Hankyu stations on 21 December 2013 with this station being designated as station number HK-77.

References

External links
Station website 

Railway stations in Japan opened in 1928
Hankyu Kyoto Main Line
Railway stations in Kyoto Prefecture